Dinara Safina was the defending champion, but lost in the second round to Alexandra Dulgheru.

Unseeded María José Martínez Sánchez won in the final 7–6(7–5), 7–5, against Jelena Janković.

Top seed and world No. 1 Serena Williams made it to the semifinals, but was edged by Janković after failing to convert a match point.

Unseeded and former world No. 1 Ana Ivanovic also made a surprise run into the semifinals by beating two top 10 players and a top 15 player, but failed to defeat Martínez Sánchez.

Seeds
The top eight seeds receive a bye into the second round.

Draw

Finals

Top half

Section 1

Section 2

Bottom half

Section 3

Section 4

References
Main draw
Qualifying draw

Specific

Italian Open - Singles
Women's Singles